Petre Luscalov (15 April 1927 – 15 January 2004) was a Romanian writer of children books.

Luscalov was born in Chișinău on 15 April 1927 and died in Bucharest on 15 January 2004, aged 76.

Bibliography 

Nufărul roșu (1950)
80000 de prieteni (1950)
Tăuraşul
Cerbul alb (1966)
Ostrovul Lupilor (1968)
Extraordinarele peripeţii ale lui Scatiu şi ale prietenului său Babuşcă (1971)
lubire interzisa (1974)
Fiul munților (1979)
Pasărea măiastră (1981)

Filmography 

 1981  
 1976 Alarmă în Deltă 
 1973 Aventurile lui Babuşcă (novel 'Ostrovul Lupilor')/(screenplay) 
 1964 Pisica de mare (writer) 
 1957 Eruptia (writer)

References

External links
 

Library of Congress
https://lccn.loc.gov/75529898
https://lccn.loc.gov/80451895

20th-century Romanian novelists
1927 births
2004 deaths
Romanian children's writers
Romanian male novelists